Hillerød station is a railway station serving the city of Hillerød north of Copenhagen, Denmark. It is the terminus of four railways lines:
 An S-train line (Nordbanen) from Copenhagen, operated by DSB
 Frederiksværkbanen, operated by Lokaltog
 Gribskovbanen, operated by Lokaltog
 Lille Nord towards Helsingør, operated by Lokaltog

Though there are track connections between the four railways, they are seldom used; each has its own dedicated dead-end platform tracks.

The bus terminal in front of the station is a major hub for transportation throughout northeastern Zealand.

See also
 List of railway stations in Denmark

References

External links

 Lokaltog

S-train (Copenhagen) stations
Railway stations in the Capital Region of Denmark
Buildings and structures in Hillerød Municipality
Railway stations opened in 1864
1864 establishments in Denmark
Hillerød
Railway stations in Denmark opened in the 19th century